The Gate of the Catalan Countries, a work of the sculptor Emili Armengol, marks the Northern starting location of the Catalan Countries in Salses, Pyrénées-Orientales (this part of France belongs to what is also called Catalunya Nord, English: Northern Catalonia).

After more than 20 years since the beginning of the project (often stopped, and even sometimes forbidden), it was finally inaugurated on September 28, 2003, being visible from the highway. Its conception and execution was in charge of the Union for the Catalan Region.

The aerial view of the monument reminds a sickle, in reference to Els Segadors anthem.

External links 
 Official association page for the Gate of the Catalan Countries

2003 sculptures
Buildings and structures in Pyrénées-Orientales
 Gate
Northern Catalonia
Outdoor sculptures in France
Tourist attractions in Pyrénées-Orientales